The 2017 Penn State Nittany Lions football team represented Pennsylvania State University in the 2017 NCAA Division I FBS football season. The team was led by fourth-year head coach James Franklin and played its home games in Beaver Stadium in University Park, Pennsylvania. They were a member of the East Division of the Big Ten Conference.

Penn State entered the season as defending Big Ten champions, and were ranked sixth in the preseason AP Poll. The team won its first seven games by an average margin of victory of 30 points, including a 42–13 rout of No. 19 Michigan, and rose to second in the AP Poll. In a highly anticipated road match-up against No. 6 Ohio State, Penn State lost by a score of 38–39. The following week, the team fell again on the road to Michigan State. These would prove to be Penn State's only losses, as they finished the regular season tied for second in the East Division with a conference record of 7–2. They were invited to the 2017 Fiesta Bowl, where they defeated Washington, and finished the season at 11–2 and ranked eighth in the final polls.

The team was led on offense by running back Saquon Barkley and quarterback Trace McSorley. Barkley led the conference with 18 rushing touchdowns to go along with 1,271 rushing yards, and was named a consensus first-team All-American as an all-purpose back. McSorley's 3,571 passing yards and 284 pass completions also led the conference. On defense, safety Marcus Allen was named first-team all-conference by the coaches.

Background

Previous season 

In 2016, the Nittany Lions had their most successful season in recent years, having won no more than nine games in any of the preceding six seasons. They topped that with an 11–3 record in 2016, moving from an unranked position to a No. 5 ranking by the CFP, AP and Coaches polls. The Nittany Lions also won both the Big Ten's East Division and the Big Ten Championship, and they participated in the Rose Bowl.

2017 NFL Draft 

Nittany Lions who were picked in the 2017 NFL Draft or signed undrafted free agent contracts:

Returning starters

Offense

Defense

Special teams

Recruits 
Penn State's recruiting class consisted of 21 recruits, including four that enrolled early. Penn State's recruiting class was ranked No. 15 by Scout, No. 10 by Rivals, and No. 17 by ESPN.

Personnel

Roster

Coaching staff

Schedule

Spring game

Season 
During the 2017 Nittany Lions season, Penn State met with non-conference opponents Akron, Pittsburgh and Georgia State (first ever meeting) and faced Big Ten conference opponents Iowa, Indiana, Northwestern, Michigan, Ohio State, Michigan State, Nebraska, Rutgers and Maryland. They also received an invitation to participate in the Fiesta Bowl against Washington. The 2017 schedule consisted of 7 home, 5 away, and 1 neutral-site games.

Penn State started the season 7–0, which included a stunning buzzer-beater victory at Iowa, and a home blowout over No. 19 Michigan. The team's first loss was at No. 6 Ohio State, where a furious comeback rally was not enough to suppress the Buckeyes. The next week, Penn State was upset at No. 24 Michigan State on a game-winning field goal. Penn State bounced back, however, with a 4-game winning streak, including a Fiesta Bowl win over No. 11 Washington.

Schedule Source:

Rankings

Game summaries

Akron

Pittsburgh

Georgia State

at Iowa

Indiana

at Northwestern

#19 Michigan

at #6 Ohio State

at #24 Michigan State

Rutgers

Nebraska

at Maryland

#12 Washington (Fiesta Bowl)

Awards and honors

Pre-season watch lists

In-season

Players in the 2018 NFL Draft

References 

Penn State
Penn State Nittany Lions football seasons
Lambert-Meadowlands Trophy seasons
Penn State Nittany Lions football
Fiesta Bowl champion seasons